XHSK-FM is a radio station on 100.7 FM in Ruiz, Nayarit. The station is owned by Grupo Radio Korita and known as La Ke Buena with a grupera format.

History

XESK-AM 1490 received its concession on January 20, 1969. It was owned by Eduardo Ponce Barbosa and broadcast with 250 watts. It was transferred to the current concessionaire in 2000 and authorized to move to FM in 2010.

As part of its 2017 concession renewal, on February 27, 2019, XHSK moved again, this time to 100.7 MHz, in order to clear 106-108 MHz as much as possible for community and indigenous radio stations.

References

Radio stations in Nayarit